Mangodara is a department or commune of Comoé Province in southern Burkina Faso. Its capital lies at the town of Mangodara. According to the 1996 census the department has a total population of 44,444.

Towns and villages
 Mangodara	(5,000 inhabitants) (capital)
 Banakelesso	(197 inhabitants)
 Bondokoro-Dioula	(163 inhabitants)
 Bondokoro-Dogosse	(1,172 inhabitants)
 Bounouba	(1,191 inhabitants)
 Dabokiri	(99 inhabitants)
 Dandougou	(1,269 inhabitants)
 Diaradougou	(1,548 inhabitants)
 Diarakorosso	(1,572 inhabitants)
 Diaya	(960 inhabitants)
 Diomanidougou	(239 inhabitants)
 Farakorosso	(3,215 inhabitants)
 Ganso	(756 inhabitants)
 Gnaminadougou	(227 inhabitants)
 Gontiedougou	(1,499 inhabitants)
 Kando	(141 inhabitants)
 Koflande	(2,828 inhabitants)
 Larabin	(584 inhabitants)
 Linguekoro	(1,177 inhabitants)
 Logogniegue	(1,140 inhabitants)
 Madiasso	(3,246 inhabitants)
 Massade-Yirikoro	(348 inhabitants)
 Mouroukoudougou	(704 inhabitants)
 Niamango	(544 inhabitants)
 Niambrigo	(964 inhabitants)
 Nerekorosso	(285 inhabitants)
 Noumoutiedougou	(2,625 inhabitants)
 Sakedougou	(119 inhabitants)
 Sirakoro	(804 inhabitants)
 Sokoura I	(1,220 inhabitants)
 Sokoura II	(1,611 inhabitants)
 Tiebata	(949 inhabitants)
 Tomikorosso	(464 inhabitants)
 Torandougou	(1,449 inhabitants)
 Touroukoro	(4,135 inhabitants)

References

Departments of Burkina Faso
Comoé Province